Ellychnia greeni is a species of firefly in the genus Ellychnia.

References

Lampyridae
Beetles described in 1962